Epistulae ad Atticum (Latin for "Letters to Atticus") is a collection of letters from Roman politician and orator Marcus Tullius Cicero to his close friend Titus Pomponius Atticus. The letters in this collection, together with Cicero's other letters, are considered the most reliable sources of information for the period leading up to the fall of the Roman Republic. The letters to Atticus are special among Cicero's works in that they provide a candid view into his personal character — containing confession, frank self-revelation, and a record of his moods from day to day, without alteration. Traditionally spanning 16 books, the collection features letters from 68 to 44 BCE. A notable absence of early references to these particular letters suggest that they may not have been published until the middle of the first century CE, significantly later than Cicero's other letters and quite some time after the deaths of both Cicero (43 BCE) and Atticus (32 BCE).

A manuscript containing the collection, along with Epistulae ad Quintum Fratrem, and Epistulae ad Brutum, was rediscovered in 1345 in Verona by Petrarch.  Both the original and Petrarch's copy are now lost, though a copy made for Coluccio Salutati is preserved in the Laurentian Library in Florence.

References

External links
 
 Letters to Atticus, Perseus Digital Library
Cicero, letters to Atticus at The Latin library
 Cicero, Letters to Atticus, translated  by Eric Otto Winstedt: volume 1, volume 2, volume 3, (1912-18), Loeb Classical Library, at the Internet Archive

1st-century BC works
Collections of letters
Works by Cicero